"Rain Is Falling" is a song written and performed by Electric Light Orchestra (ELO).

It was track seven on the album Time (1981) and was released as the third single from the album in the US in 1982.

As with many ELO songs written by Jeff Lynne, "Rain is Falling" uses rain as a metaphor for loss and sadness.  ELO writer Barry Delve calls it "classic ELO – a beautifully sung evocative ballad with a gorgeous melody, and sound effects that perfectly conjure up the emptiness of a rainy day."  Delve does highlight one major flaw in the song, that the third verse starts well with the lines "Looking through this window/A thousand rivers running past my door" but then the lyrics devolve into the album's time travel concept that have little to do with the rest of the song.

Billboard called it a "grand orchestral showcase in which Jeff Lynne showcases his vocal diversity." Record World said that "celestial falsetto choruses introduce Jeff Lynne's childlike vocal lead" and that "swirling playful keyboards create a magical backdrop."

It was the band's first single in the United States that failed to chart in the Billboard Hot 100 since "Boy Blue" (1975). It came incredibly close, peaking at 101 in the Bubbling Under Hot 100 Singles chart.  Delve attributed the commercial failure of the single to the fact that the third verse makes little sense outside the context of the album.

B-side

Another Heart Breaks
"Another Heart Breaks" is a song written and performed by the Electric Light Orchestra.

It was track six from their 1981 album Time.  The track is mostly instrumental with the verse "Another Heart Breaks" repeated over and over.

Chart positions

References

1982 songs
Electric Light Orchestra songs
Song recordings produced by Jeff Lynne
Songs written by Jeff Lynne
Jet Records singles
1981 songs